The Little Boy from Manly was a national personification of New South Wales and later Australia created by the cartoonist Livingston Hopkins of The Bulletin in April 1885.

In March 1885, as the New South Wales Contingent was about to depart for the Sudan, a letter was addressed to Premier William Bede Dalley containing a cheque for £25 for the Patriotic Fund 'with my best wishes from a little boy at Manly'. It was Australia's first overseas military adventure, and the little boy became a symbol either of Australian patriotism or, among opponents of the adventure, of mindless chauvinism. Hopkins put the boy in a cartoon, dressed in the pantaloons and frilled shirt associated with English storybook schoolboys of the namby-pamby kind. Over the following decades, he became The Bulletin'''s stock symbol of Young Australia.

References

 External links 
 nla.pic-an6426507 Cartoon A jubilee featuring the Little Boy from Manly, National Library of Australia.
 Births of a Nation Powerhouse Museum.
 itemID=844353 Cartoon The Roll Call - or The Contingent's Return'' with the Little Boy from Manly in right foreground (1885) by Livingston Hopkins, State Library of New South Wales.

National personifications
National symbols of Australia
Manly, New South Wales
Comics characters introduced in 1885